Stružinec is a municipality and village in Semily District in the Liberec Region of the Czech Republic. It has about 700 inhabitants.

Administrative parts
Villages of Bezděčín, Pohoří and Tuhaň are administrative parts of Stružinec.

References

Villages in Semily District